Parornix arbutifoliella is a moth of the family Gracillariidae. It is known from Pennsylvania and Maine in the United States.

The larvae feed on Photinia pyrifolia. They mine the leaves of their host plant.

References

Parornix
Moths of North America
Moths described in 1907